Yorane Julians (born 22 May 1981 in Massy, Essonne, France) is a French basketball player who played 34 games for French Pro A league club Chalons en Champagne during the 2004-2005 season.

References

External links

French men's basketball players
1981 births
Living people
Sportspeople from Essonne
21st-century French people
People from Massy, Essonne